Gregory Gibson (born July 10, 1945, in Athol, Massachusetts) is an American author.

Gibson is the author of Gone Boy: A Walkabout (Kodansha, 1999), Demon of the Waters (Little, Brown, 2004), Hubert's Freaks (Harcourt, 2008). and The Old Turk's Load (Mysterious Press, 2013)

After receiving his BA from Swarthmore College in 1967, Gregory Gibson enlisted in the United States Navy and worked as a shipfitter until 1971. Gibson has said he considers this period “an ideal grad school experience.”

After his discharge from the Navy in 1971 he moved to Gloucester, Massachusetts and was variously employed as a house painter, cab driver, and construction worker. In 1974 he married Anne Marie Crotty, and in 1976 he opened Ten Pound Book Company, and began his career as an antiquarian book dealer.

In 1992 their oldest son Galen was murdered, the random victim of a school shooting by a disturbed fellow student at Simon's Rock College in Great Barrington, Massachusetts. The shock of this event caused him to write a memoir about his investigation of how such a thing could have happened. The book, Gone Boy, met with critical success, and was Entertainment Weekly’s “Best Book of the Year” for 1999. This was followed in 2002 by Demon of the Waters: The True Story of the Mutiny of the Whaleship Globe, which The New York Times deemed “a worthy contribution to the literature of whaling.” Gibson's third non-fiction book, Hubert's Freaks (2008), traces the career of a gifted but troubled antiquarian book dealer who discovers a trove of hitherto unknown photographs by the great American photographer Diane Arbus. Larry McMurtry said of the book, “Hubert's Freaks will fascinate those among us who are continually stimulated by the richness and variety of American subcultures. I devoured it.” In 2013 Gibson's first crime novel, The Old Turk's Load, was published. The book was named a Deadly Pleasures “Best First Novel” and Booklist's “Best Crime Fiction Debut of the Year.” Elmore Leonard said, “I like Gibson’s writing, the effortless way he tells his story." 

In 2014 Gibson began volunteering for the newly formed Everytown for Gun Safety, working with survivors of gun violence and advocating for additional gun laws. He is available as a speaker on issues relating to gun violence, and has made frequent media appearances. His published opinion pieces such as “Message from a Club No One Wants to Join” (New York Times, February 17, 2018) consistently attract national attention. Since 1998 he has administered a small non-profit 501(c)(3) charity, The Galen Gibson Scholarship Trust. The Galen Fund contributes to local educational initiatives, to community and faith-based groups that work with victims of gun violence, and to organizations that promote more stringent gun laws. 

Gibson's fiction and non-fiction pieces specialize in the close examination of various American subcultures, from gun collectors to whaleship crewmen to freak show performers, usually as seen through the eyes of a single, strongly-delineated character. His approach combines unflinching realism with dark, dry humor. His advocacy writing is informed by his experiences as a licensed gun owner and as a survivor of gun violence.

He lives in Gloucester, Massachusetts with his wife, Anne Marie Crotty.

References

External links
 Gregory Gibson's blog

Living people
1945 births
American male writers
Swarthmore College alumni
People from Athol, Massachusetts
People from Gloucester, Massachusetts
Writers from Massachusetts
United States Navy sailors
People from Massapequa, New York